Kenneth, Kenny, or Ken James is the name of:

Entertainment
 Ken James (Australian actor) (born 1948), played Tony Wild in The Box and later played Mike O'Brien in Sons and Daughters
 Ken James, on the Canadian soap opera Riverdale
 Kenneth W. James, voice actor for Bowser in Mario games since Super Mario Galaxy
 Kenneth Tyler James, musician
 Kenny James (My Name Is Earl), a character on My Name is Earl

Sports
 Ken James (cricketer) (1904–1976), New Zealand Test cricketer
 Ken James (basketball) (born 1945), represented Australia at the 1972 Summer Olympics
 Kenny James (American football) (born 1984), running back

Other
 Ken James (politician) (1934–2014), Canadian Member of Parliament
 Kenneth James (politician), see Endorsements for the Progressive Conservative Party of Canada leadership convention, 1993
 Ken James (educator), Commissioner of Education for the state of Arkansas

See also 
 
 James Kenny (disambiguation)